The 1969 NCAA University Division Golf Championship was the 31st annual NCAA-sanctioned golf tournament to determine the individual and team national champions of men's collegiate golf in the United States.

The tournament was held at the Broadmoor Golf Club at The Broadmoor resort in Colorado Springs, Colorado.

Houston won the team title, the Cougars' eleventh NCAA team national title.

Individual results

Individual champion
 Bob Clark, Cal State Los Angeles

Team results

Note: Top 10 only
DC = Defending champions

References

NCAA Men's Golf Championship
Golf in Colorado
NCAA Golf Championship
NCAA Golf Championship
NCAA Golf Championship